Location EP is the debut EP recording by Swedish band The Grand Opening. It was digitally released on the American label It's a Trap!.

Track listing

Personnel
John Roger Olsson: vocals, guitar
Jens Pettersson: drums
Joakim Labraaten: Fender Rhodes piano
Johanna Ojala: backing vocals
Maria Stensdotter: backing vocals

References

2005 EPs
The Grand Opening albums